Kevin Claeys (born 26 March 1988) is a Belgian former professional cyclist.

Major results
2010
2nd Zellik–Galmaarden
2nd Dwars door de Antwerpse Kempen
2012
1st Ronde van Limburg
1st De Kustpijl
3rd Antwerpse Havenpijl
3rd Circuit de Wallonie
2013
2nd Ronde van Limburg

References

External links

1988 births
Living people
Belgian male cyclists
People from Roeselare
Cyclists from West Flanders